William David "Dai" Morris MBE (born 11 November 1941 in Rhigos, Cynon Valley) is a Welsh former rugby union footballer, who won 34 caps for Wales in the years between 1967 and 1974, scoring six tries. His usual position was as a back-row forward, either at blind-side flanker or at Number 8, positions he occupied for both Wales and his club sides, Neath RFC and Rhigos RFC.

During his time in the Wales team, Morris won three Five Nations Championships (one shared with France), including two Triple Crowns and one Grand Slam.

In 2002, Morris was voted into an all-time greatest Welsh XV at the blindside flanker position.

References

Further reading
 

1941 births
Living people
Ebbw Vale RFC players
Glynneath RFC players
Neath RFC players
Penarth RFC players
Rhigos RFC players
Rugby union flankers
Rugby union number eights
Rugby union players from Rhondda Cynon Taf
Wales international rugby union players
Welsh rugby union players